Carol King (born 24 July 1963) is a Nigerian actress, thespian and presenter best known for her role as "Jumoke" in the TV series Everyday People. Known for her "motherly role" in TV dramas, Carol has featured in several soap operas and movies including The Gods Are Still Not To Blame and Dazzling Mirage, a 2014 drama film directed by Tunde Kelani.

Early life and education
Born in Lagos, in then Western Nigeria to Edo-born parents, Carol attended St. Soweto Primary School Lagos where she completed her basic education and Awori Anglican Comprehensive High School Lagos where she completed her secondary school education. She proceeded to obtain a Diploma in Insurance at Ahmadu Bello University before being awarded a bachelor's degree in Christian Religious Studies at Lagos State University.

Personal life
Caroline King currently resides in Lagos State and is married to Captain Kolawole King with whom she has three children after her failed first marriage.

Career
Carol's acting career began after she attended an audition for a radio drama titled I Need To Know before she went on to become a household name after her role in the TV series Everyday People. She has starred in several stage plays, dramas, and movies including Dazzling Mirage, Pasito Dehinde, and The Gods Are Still Not To Blame. In recognition for her role in the advancement of the film industry, Carol was awarded with "African Youth Role Model Award" in 2009.

Selected filmography

TV series
 I Need To Know
 Everyday People
 Tinsel
 Edge of Paradise
 Blaze of Glory
 Eko Law
 Emerald
 Skinny Girl In Transit
 Wura

Stage drama
 V-Monologues
 Ajayi Crowther
 Five Maidens of Fadaka
 Prison Chronicles
 The Wives

Films
 Pasito Dehinde
 Dazzling Mirage
 For Colored Girls
 The Gods Are Still Not To Blame
 Journey To Self
 North East
A Naija Christmas

See also
 List of Nigerian actresses

References

20th-century Nigerian actresses
21st-century Nigerian actresses
1963 births
Living people
Lagos State University alumni
Ahmadu Bello University alumni
Actresses from Lagos
Actresses from Edo State
Nigerian television presenters